Nelson is a suburb of Sydney, in the state of New South Wales, Australia 42 kilometres north-west of the Sydney central business district in the local government area of The Hills Shire. It is part of the Hills District.

References

Suburbs of Sydney
The Hills Shire